is a Japanese architect and author on architecture. His major works, including Kyōto Station, the Umeda Sky Building in Osaka, the Yamato International building in Tokyo, the Sapporo Dome in Hokkaidō, and other important structures in Japan, have earned many awards. With a doctorate in engineering, he was a professor at the University of Tokyo until 1997, and has held an emeritus position since that time.

Education
Hiroshi Hara graduated from the University of Tokyo with a BA in 1959, and subsequently earned an MA in 1961 and a PhD in 1964, also from the University of Tokyo. He became an associate professor in the Faculty of Architecture at Tokyo University in 1964 and an associate professor at the Institute of Industrial Science at the University of Tokyo in 1969. He attended Harvard University's Summer Seminar in 1968. He collaborates with Atelier Φ for design practices from 1970. In 1982, Hara became professor at the Institute of Industrial Science at the University of Tokyo, and in 1997, professor emeritus at the University of Tokyo. He changed the designation to "Hiroshi Hara + Atelier Φ" from 1999.

Publications
Hiroshi Hara is not only known as an architect but also as an author of theoretical essays on architecture and cities, amongst others the essay "Discrete City".

Works
1974 : Hara House, Tokyo
1986 : Tasaki Museum of Art, Karuizawa, Nagano
1987 : Naha Municipal Josei Primary School, Naha, Okinawa
1987 : Yamato International, Ōta, Tokyo
1987 : Kenju Park 'Forest House', Nakaniida, Miyagi Prefecture
1988 : Iida City Museum, Iida, Nagano Prefecture
1992 : Uchiko Municipal Ose Middle School, Uchiko, Ehime
1993 : Umeda Sky Building, Kita-ku, Osaka
1997 : Kyoto Station Complex, Shimogyo-ku, Kyoto
1998 : Miyagi Prefectural Library, Sendai, Miyagi Prefecture
2000 : Hiroshima Municipal Motomachi High School, Hiroshima
2001 : Sapporo Dome, Sapporo, Hokkaidō
2001 : University of Tokyo, Komaba II Campus, Tokyo
2003 : Tokamachi Stage, Tokamachi, Niigata
2004 : Casa Experimental, Montevideo, Uruguay
2005 : Casa Experimental, Cordoba, Argentina
2005 : Shimokita Snow-Resistant Dome, Mutsu, Aomori
2007 : Aizu Gakuho Middle School and High School, Aizuwakamatsu, Fukushima Prefecture
2010 : Casa Experimental, La Paz, Bolivia

Notes

References

 Discrete City: Hiroshi Hara, Architects – HARA
 Hiroshi Hara, The Floating World of Architecture, H. Hara, B. Bognar, John Wiley & Sons; 2001

External links

20th-century Japanese architects
1936 births
Living people
University of Tokyo alumni
Academic staff of the University of Tokyo
21st-century Japanese architects